
Gmina Cisek, German Gemeinde Czissek is a rural gmina (administrative district) in Kędzierzyn-Koźle County, Opole Voivodeship, in south-western Poland.

Since 2007 the commune has been bilingual in German and Polish, and has its signs in two languages. These signs celebrate the multicultural past of the region, which was prior to 1945 part of Germany and still maintains a large German population.

Administrative divisions
The commune contains the villages and settlements of:

Cisek
Błażejowice
Dzielnica
Kobylice
Landzmierz
Łany
Miejsce Odrzańskie
Nieznaszyn
Podlesie
Przewóz
Roszowice
Roszowicki Las
Steblów
Sukowice

Neighbouring gminas
Gmina Cisek is bordered by the gminas of Kuźnia Raciborska and Rudnik.

Gallery

References

Cisek
Kędzierzyn-Koźle County